LAUNCH is a program sponsored by  NASA, Nike, US Agency for International Development, and the US Department of State that seeks sustainable innovations through quasi-annual challenges, forums, and a business accelerator. The program began in 2010 and has since focused on themes such as energy, health, water, and waste solutions.

History

2010: LAUNCH Water and LAUNCH Health 
Launch was founded in 2010 by NASA, Nike, USAID, and the US Department of State. The inaugural event, LAUNCH: Water, was held at the NASA Kennedy Space Station in March 2010 and highlighted innovations and research related to water sustainability. Some of the innovations included bacterial water sensing, a floating contaminant sensor network, and evaporation-based underground irrigation technology.

The second LAUNCH forum, LAUNCH: Health, took place in October of that same year, also at the Kennedy Space Center. This challenge highlighted innovations in optimal nutrition (access, choice, and quality of nutritious food and required nutrients), primary preventive health care, and ways to improve fitness and lifestyle choices.

2011: LAUNCH Energy 
The LAUNCH: Energy forum took place in November 2011 at the Kennedy Space Center and highlighted innovations in sustainable energy systems. The forum featured innovations in fuel cell technology, electricity management, and clean cookstoves.

2012: LAUNCH Beyond Waste 
LAUNCH Beyond waste took place in 2012 at NASA's Jet Propulsion Laboratory in Pasadena, California. This cycle highlighted nine innovations in the fields of waste-to-energy, ‘eWaste’, ‘upcycling’ and recycling, agricultural waste and conservation, medical waste, sustainable chemicals and materials, and improved sanitation. The forum also included sessions about how to accelerate these innovations towards real-world implementation.

In 2012, LAUNCH: Health Innovator Samuel Sia's company OPKO Health was awarded a contract to implement their diagnostic platform on the international space station. Numerous LAUNCH: Beyond Waste innovators were recognized for their projects in the fall of 2012. Joseph Aramburu was named one of Forbes 30 under 30 Social Entrepreneurs for project re:char and Ashnu Gupta was named India's Social Entrepreneur of the Year by the World Economic Forum for his company Goonj. Attero Recycling (India): Nitin Gupta - India's leading provider of end-to-end electronic and electrical goods e-Waste management servicesf

2013: LAUNCH Systems and Micro-Challenge 
In May 2013 LAUNCH convened first the LAUNCH 2020 Summit in Beaverton Oregon, a two-day event showcasing unique approaches to sustainability challenges with over 150 companies, NGOs, academics, and manufacturers in attendance. The summit also unveiled the LAUNCH 2013 Challenge Statement.

LAUNCH: Systems Forum will take place in September 2013 at the Jet Propulsion Lab and will have a focus on transforming fabrics manufacturing to increase equity and sustainability. In 2013 LAUNCH also accepted submissions for its first 'micro-challenge,' directed at student researchers and entrepreneurs. The Micro-Challenge has a focus on capturing data from the materials supply chain and using it to better understand the materials system. In 2013 LAUNCH was highlighted by Harvard's Ash Center for Democratic Governance and Innovation as one of the 'Top 25 Innovators in Government' putting it in contention for the Ford Foundation's 'Innovators In Government' Award unveiled in the fall of 2013. In May 2013, LAUNCH alumnus SEaB Energy won the Resource Revolution Award in the Category 'Energy from Waste.'

List of Innovators

References 

Science competitions